Yuzawa may refer to:

Places
 Yuzawa, Akita, Japan
 Yuzawa, Niigata, Japan

People with the surname
, Japanese-American community activist
, Japanese footballer
, Japanese bureaucrat 
, Japanese table tennis player
, Japanese footballer

Japanese-language surnames